In mathematics, some boundary value problems can be solved using the methods of stochastic analysis. Perhaps the most celebrated example is Shizuo Kakutani's 1944 solution of the Dirichlet problem for the Laplace operator using Brownian motion. However, it turns out that for a large class of semi-elliptic second-order partial differential equations the associated Dirichlet boundary value problem can be solved using an Itō process that solves an associated stochastic differential equation.

Introduction: Kakutani's solution to the classical Dirichlet problem

Let  be the Laplace operator, let  be a bounded function on the boundary , and consider the problem:

See theorem 3 in Kakutani 1944, p. 710.

The Dirichlet–Poisson problem

Consider the Poisson problem:

The idea of the stochastic method for solving this problem is as follows. For example,  can be taken to be the solution to the stochastic differential equation:

where  is n-dimensional Brownian motion,  has components  as above, and the matrix field  is chosen so that:

In this notation, the candidate solution for (P1) is:

provided that  is a bounded function and that:

It turns out that one further condition is required:

For all , the process  starting at  almost surely leaves  in finite time. Under this assumption, the candidate solution above reduces to:

Moreover, if  satisfies (P2) and there exists a constant  such that, for all :

then .

References

 
 
  (See Section 9)

Boundary value problems
Partial differential equations
Stochastic differential equations